Thromidia seychellesensis is a species of starfish of the Mithrodiidae family and was described in 1977.

References 

Mithrodiidae